Albihn is a surname. Notable people with the surname include: 

Claes Albihn (born 1971), Swedish athlete
Ernst Albihn (1892–1944), Swedish merchant, football player, and referee
Ture Albihn, footballer

See also
Albin (surname)